Athelstan Laurence Johnson Beckwith AO, FRS (20 February 1930 – 15 May 2010) was an Australian chemist. He was a fellow of the Australian Academy of Science.

Life
He earned a BSc, from the University of Western Australia in 1952, and DPhil, from the University of Oxford in 1956. In 1960, he won the Rennie Memorial Medal. In 1961, he won a Nuffield Scholarship to study with Sir Derek Barton.

He taught at the University of Adelaide.
He was Professor of Organic Chemistry at the Australian National University, from 1981 to 1995. In the 2004 Queen's Birthday Honours he was appointed an Officer of the Order of Australia for "service to science in the field of organic chemistry as a leading researcher and academic, and through the provision of advice to government and the wider community on scientific matters".

Family
He was married; they had three children.

References

External links
http://www.publish.csiro.au/pid/6821.htm

1930 births
2010 deaths
Australian chemists
Fellows of the Royal Society
Fellows of the Australian Academy of Science
Officers of the Order of Australia